Bhira Kheri is a town located in the Lakhimpur Kheri district of Lucknow division, in the Uttar Pradesh state of India.  It is situated 35 km away from the Indo-Nepal border.

Bhira is the largest [Nagar Panchayat] (in terms of area) in the Lakhimpur Kheri district.  It is rich in natural resources with lush green scenery. The main source of water is the Sarda River.

Geography 
 Latitude : 27.6 to 28.6 (North)
 Longitude : 80.34 to 81.30 (East)

It shares its boundaries with:
 North – Palia Kalan (15km)
 West – Kishanpur forest (2km)
 South – Mailani (16km)
 East – Bijua (15km).

Government and politics 

 Parliamentary Constituencies - Kheri (Lok Sabha constituency)
 Tehsils -  Palia.
 Blocks -  Bijuwa.
 Nagar Panchayat-Bhira.
Primary hospital - One beat hospital.
Gram Pardhan Charu Shukla

Education 
Education is available at the Junior and Senior Basic Schools, Senior Secondary Schools and college level. Vivekanand Academy (ICSE), Maharaja Agarsen Academy, Akal Academy Santgarh, Global Academy, Faith Academy, Chhaju Ram Cane Growers Inter College & Zila Panchayat Inter College Aadarsh Janta inter college are good senior secondary colleges. There are also degree colleges Manmeet Nagar degree college, Smrati Mahavidyalaya and One Beat Medical College.

References 

Cities and towns in Lakhimpur Kheri district